, or  is a jazz festival in Burghausen, Altötting, Germany. It was founded in 1970 by Joe Viera.

Jazz festivals in Germany
Music festivals established in 1970
1970 establishments in Germany
Altötting (district)